In axiomatic set theory, the gimel function is the following function mapping cardinal numbers to cardinal numbers:

where cf denotes the cofinality function; the gimel function is used for studying the continuum function and the cardinal exponentiation function. The symbol  is a serif form of the Hebrew letter gimel.

Values of the gimel function

The gimel function has the property   for all infinite cardinals  by König's theorem.

For regular cardinals 
, 
, and Easton's theorem says we don't know much about the values of this function.   For singular 
, upper bounds for  can be found from   Shelah's PCF theory.

The gimel hypothesis

The gimel hypothesis states that . In essence, this means that  for singular  is the smallest value allowed by the axioms of Zermelo–Fraenkel set theory (assuming consistency).

Under this hypothesis cardinal exponentiation is simplified, though not to the extent of the continuum hypothesis (which implies the gimel hypothesis).

Reducing the exponentiation function to the gimel function

 showed that all cardinal exponentiation is determined (recursively) by the gimel function as follows. 

If  is an infinite regular cardinal (in particular any infinite successor) then 
If  is infinite and singular and the continuum function is eventually constant below  then 
If  is a limit and the continuum function is not eventually constant below  then 

If  then 
If  for some  then 

See also
 Aleph number
 Beth number

References

 
Thomas Jech,  Set Theory, 3rd millennium ed., 2003, Springer Monographs in Mathematics, Springer, .

Cardinal numbers